Lil' Red is one of two mascots representing University of Nebraska–Lincoln's athletic programs. Lil' Red was created in 1993, after a statewide contest was conducted to find a counterpart for Herbie Husker. Then-associate athletic director Barbara Hibner spearheaded the contest, hoping a second mascot would appeal to Nebraska's young fans. The mascot has since become a recognizable part of Nebraska athletics culture.

Though Lil' Red's initial intention was mainly to represent the school's volleyball team, it can now 
be seen on the Memorial Stadium sideline at Nebraska football games, as well as Pinnacle Bank Arena during Nebraska basketball games.

Due to the outfit's incredibly light weight, the larger-than-life mascot can run, dance, shake hands, and crowd surf.

Lil' Red won the national championship at the NCAA National Mascot Competition in 1999, and was inducted into the Mascot Hall of Fame in 2007, which selected its winners through an online vote.

See also
Nebraska Cornhuskers
Herbie Husker

References

Big Ten Conference mascots
Nebraska Cornhuskers
Mascots introduced in 1994